St. Godehard is a church in Hildesheim, Germany, formerly the church of a Benedictine abbey. It remained almost unaltered through the centuries and was not damaged much in World War II. It is one of the most important examples of Romanesque architecture in Germany.

It is a church of the Catholic parish Heilig Kreuz. The basilica has served as the "cathedral" of the bishop of Hildesheim from 1945 to 1960, when the Hildesheim Cathedral was destroyed and rebuilt, and from 2010, when restoration of the cathedral began. The Hezilo chandelier was installed in St. Godehard during the restoration time.

History 

Godehard of Hildesheim, a Benedictine and an influential bishop of Hildesheim from 1022 to 1038, was canonized in 1133. The same year, Bishop Bernard of Hildesheim founded the monastery and church in his honour. The church was completed in 1172 and consecrated by Bischof Adelog to St. Mary and St. Godehard.

In 1963, it was awarded the title of a Basilica minor by Pope Paul VI. 

The former convent buildings are used for the Fachhochschule für Verwaltung und Rechtspflege (University of Applied Sciences for administration and law).

References

Further reading 
 Michael Brandt (ed.): Der Schatz von St Godehard, Ausstellungskatalog Diözesan-Museum Hildesheim, Bernward-Verlag GmbH, 2nd edition, Hildesheim 1988, 
 Kurd Fleige: Kirchenkunst, Kapitellsymbolik und profane Bauten: Ausgewählte Aufsätze zur Bau- und Kunstgeschichte Hildesheims und seiner Umgebung, Bernward-Verlag GmbH, Hildesheim 1993, 
 Gerhard Lutz/Angela Weyer: St. Godehard in Hildesheim - Der Bau und seine Ausmalung im Wandel der Zeit in Matthias Exner/Ursula Schädler-Saub (Hrsg.): Die Restaurierung der Restaurierung? - Zum Umgang mit Wandmalereien und Architekturfassungen des Mittelalters im 19. und 20. Jahrhundert, ICOMOS Nationalkomitee der Bundesrepublik Deutschland, München 2002, 
 Ursula Schädler-Saub: Mittelalterliche Kirchen in Niedersachsen - Wege der Erhaltung und Restaurierung, Michael Imhof Verlag, Petersbeg 2000, 
 Christian Stallmann (Hrsg.): Sankt Godehardi zu Hildesheim - aus Geschichte und Gegenwart, aus Anlass der Gründung der Norddeutschen Fachhochschule für Rechtspflege, Hildesheim 2008,

External links 

 Basilika St. Godehard, Hildesheim kathedralen.net
 Dekanat Hildesheim / Katholische Kirche in Hildesheim 

Hildesheim Godehard
Hildesheim Godehard
Godehard
Hildesheim Godehard
Hildesheim
Churches in the Diocese of Hildesheim